Sir Robert Cann, 1st Baronet (c. 1621–1685), of Small Street, Bristol and Stoke Bishop, Westbury-on-Trym, Gloucestershire, was an English politician. He was Mayor of Bristol in 1662, a member of the Society of Merchant Venturers, and enlarged Trinity Theological College at Stoke Bishop. Cann campaigned for a law against kidnapping of white children for plantation work, but was himself fined in 1685 for taking criminals from Bristol to work on Bristol-owned Caribbean plantations.

He was a Member (MP) of the Parliament of England for Bristol on 11 February 1678, March 1679, and October 1679 – 28 October 1680.

References

1621 births
1685 deaths
English MPs 1679
Businesspeople from Bristol
Baronets in the Baronetage of England
English MPs 1680–1681
People from Gloucestershire
English slave traders
Members of the Society of Merchant Venturers
17th-century English businesspeople